= Operation Scheduled Departure =

Operation Scheduled Departure was a 2008 project of U.S. Immigration and Customs Enforcement (ICE) to organize the voluntary deportations of 457,000 eligible illegal immigrants from five U.S. cities. The goal was to benefit the government with a "quick, cheap" reduction in the fugitive count, and to save money by not having to keep immigrants in detention centers.

== Operation ==
The operation was first announced on a Univision Sunday news program and formally began on August 5 and ended on August 22. The five targeted cities were Charlotte, North Carolina, Chicago, Illinois, Santa Ana, California (Los Angeles area), Phoenix, Arizona, and San Diego, California. Illegal immigrants who ignored a deportation order ("fugitives") and didn't have a criminal record could walk into an ICE office and agree to be deported. They would be given 90 days to make arrangements for their U.S. born children. Of the 457,000 fugitives eligible for the program, 8 volunteered to be deported.
